Koson is a city in Koson District of Qashqadaryo Region in Uzbekistan. It is the administrative center of Koson District. The town population in 1989 was 40,655 people, and 68,900 in 2016.

References

Populated places in Qashqadaryo Region
Cities in Uzbekistan